Shome is a Bengali Hindu surname. Notable people with the surname include:

Chitra Singh (born 1945), born Shome, Indian ghazal singer, also known as Chitra Dutta
Gautam Shome Sr. (born 1960), Indian cricketer
Gautam Shome Jr. (born 1963), Indian cricketer
Mihir Kanti Shome, Indian politician
Pratibha Basu (1915–2006), born Shome, Bengali writer, also known as Ranu Shome
Shamit Shome (born 1997), Canadian soccer player
Sumit Shome (born 1955), Indian cricketer
Sunit Shome (born 1932), Indian cricketer
Tillotama Shome, Indian actress
Title character of Bhuvan Shome

See also
Shome Panel, Indian government committee

Indian surnames
Bengali Hindu surnames